Morindopsis is a genus of flowering plants belonging to the family Rubiaceae.

Its native range is India to Indo-China.

Species:
 Morindopsis capillaris (Kurz) Kurz

References

Rubiaceae
Rubiaceae genera